Chene may refer to:

People
 Chene Lawson (born 1971), American actress
 Chene la Rochelle, Canadian equestrian
 Dixie Chene, American actress
 Henri Le Chêne (1891-?), French wartime agent
 Léon Chené (1905–1992), French racing cyclist
 Marie-Thérèse Le Chêne
 Patrick Chêne (born 1956), French journalist
 Pierre Le Chêne (1900–1979)

Places
 Chêne, Montreux, France
 Chene Park, in the Detroit International Riverfront
 Chêne River, Canada
 Chêne-Arnoult, France
 Chêne-Bernard, France
 Chêne-Bougeries, Switzerland
 Chêne-Bourg, Switzerland
 Chêne-Pâquier, Switzerland
 Chêne-Sec, France
 Chêne-en-Semine, France
 Le Chêne, France